Andrenosoma atra is a species of fly belonging to the family Asilidae.

It is native to Europe.

References

Asilidae
Taxa named by Carl Linnaeus
Flies described in 1758
Asilomorph flies of Europe